The Bank of Bigheart was a bank based in Barnsdall, Oklahoma and is also the name of its surviving historic commercial building, at 308 W. Main St. in Barnsdall.

It is one of four small bank buildings built in Richardsonian Romanesque style in Osage County, Oklahoma during 1904–1911, the peak of the county's oil boom.  The others are Bank of Hominy, Bank of Burbank, and Osage Bank of Fairfax.

The Bank of Bigheart was founded in what was then the town of Bigheart, Oklahoma, and was renamed to Barnsdall in 1922. The building, constructed in 1911, served the bank until the bank closed in the 1930s, amidst the Great Depression.  It was listed on the National Register of Historic Places in 1984.

In April 1911  a tornado destroyed much of the town which was known as Bigheart at that time. (The name was changed in 1921). The building was constructed in 1911 (before or after the tornado???) .

When listed, it was the oldest surviving commercial building in Barnsdall.

Construction

The building is an example of late Richardsonian Romanesque architecture. It is built of native sandstone. The lower level features large arched windows typical of Richardsonian Romanesque buildings. The upper story has a smaller deeply set window with straight tops which are arranged in ribbon-like fashion, while the roofline features crenelations, both of which are characteristic of Richardsonian Romanesque.

Operating history
The first floor of the building originally contained the Bank of Bigheart.

The bank was renamed the Barnsdall State Bank in 1925. which remained in the building until 1976, when it relocated to the present-day American Heritage Bank building. It has since contained a variety of businesses including a drug store and tavern. The second floor was originally used for professional offices and continued to do so at least through the 1980s, but has been vacant since then. 

According to the Bigheart Times, other tenants in the building have included the town of Barnsdall, which used it as a city hall and as a library, International Order of  Oddfellows (IOOF) and its auxiliary (the Rebekah Lodge). The ground floor currently has two retail tenants: a flower shop called Twig and Berries, and The Hen House, which sells handcrafted items, as well as fresh eggs.  In 2014, Cliff Taylor, then owner of the building, began a renovation program by replacing all of the windows on the second floor.

Listing

It was deemed significant for listing on the National Register as "it is the oldest surviving commercial building in Bigheart (now Barnsdall)" and it is "among the four oldest banks in Osage County", and "it is one of the finest representations of Richardsonian Romanesque architecture as applied to a commercial building in Osage County."

The bank is located on the northwest corner of W. Main St. and 5th St. in Barnsdale, on Oklahoma State Highway 11.  It is adjoined on its east side by another two-story commercial building on W. Main.  In 2023, the building appears occupied but not in retail commercial use, as there is no visible signage.

In 2023, Barnsdall is served by at least one bank, the American Heritage Bank, on the east end of the same block, at 400 W. Main St.

References

Articles on 1911 tornado
Oklahoma State Historical Preservation Office entry.

Bank buildings on the National Register of Historic Places in Oklahoma
Buildings and structures in Osage County, Oklahoma
Richardsonian Romanesque architecture in Oklahoma
Commercial buildings completed in 1911
1911 establishments in Oklahoma
National Register of Historic Places in Osage County, Oklahoma